Ilsfeld is a municipality in the district of Heilbronn in Baden-Württemberg in Germany, on the outer edge of the Stuttgart Metropolitan Region. In addition to the village of Ilsfeld proper, it includes the formerly independent settlements of Auenstein and Schozach and some hamlets. Formerly predominantly agricultural, it has become more commercially oriented since an autobahn exit was built in the 1950s. The village of Ilsfeld was largely destroyed by a fire in 1904, and was rebuilt with public buildings in a rustic Württemberg style with Jugendstil elements.

Geography
Ilsfeld is located in the south of the district of Heilbronn, in and around the valley of the Schozach near the point where the Gruppenbach flows into it. Parts of the town fall within two natural areas: Schwäbisch-Fränkische Waldberge (Swabian-Franconian Wooded Mountains) and Neckarbecken (Neckar Basin).

The town is bordered by (clockwise from the south): Großbottwar (in the district of Ludwigsburg), Neckarwestheim, Lauffen am Neckar, Talheim, Untergruppenbach, Abstatt and Beilstein (all in the district of Heilbronn). It is the seat of the Gemeindeverwaltungsverband (local government association) of Schozach-Bottwartal, whose other members are Abstatt, Beilstein and Untergruppenbach.

Ilsfeld proper, Auenstein and Schozach are sections of the town; the first also includes the hamlet of Wüstenhausen, the settlements of Landturm and Untere Mühle and the neighborhood of Engelsberghöfe, and Auenstein also includes two hamlets, Abstetterhof and Helfenberg. Ilsfeld proper also formerly included the no longer extant settlements of Beuren, Bustatt or Boestat, Gendach, Froßbach and Seetham, and Auenstein formerly included Finkenbach (now part of Helfenberg) and Kapfenhardt.

History

Frankish court site
The territory of Ilsfeld has been settled almost without interruption since the Mesolithic and Neolithic. After the Franks expanded into the area, five ancient Alemannic settlements were subsumed in a royal court location that is the basis of the present-day town. At the former settlement of Gendach, on the Schozach near Ilsfeld, there was a small motte and bailey castle, no traces of which remain. The royal center at Ilsfeld led to new settlements in the area, such as Westheim (Neckarwestheim), Ostheim (Auenstein) and Talheim, named for their relationship to Ilsfeld and marked as Frankish by the termination -heim.

The first recorded mention of Ilsfeld itself is in an 1102 charter of Emperor Henry IV granting land in Ilisvelt to the Bishopric of Speyer. The name presumably designated the entire area and may have been derived from the Schozach, whose upper reaches appear to have been called the Ils. In 1157, after threats from King Conrad III, Ilsfeld returned to Hohenstaufen control. In the late 12th and 13th centuries, a local noble family developed, the Lords of Ilsfeld, who were ministeriales of the Margraves of Baden; either they or relatives of theirs were responsible for building a castle near Ilsfeld on the Wunnenstein.

Border territory of Württemberg

In 1368 Ilsfeld became the property of Württemberg; by about 1460 it had become a fief of the Vogt or reeve of Lauffen am Neckar. It was a border territory; to the north, Talheim had become the property of the Teutonic Knights, and beyond that lay for example Flein, which belonged to the Imperial City of Heilbronn, Stettenfels Castle, property of the Electorate of the Palatinate, and the County of Löwenstein. In 1450, during Count Ulrich V's war against 30 Swabian Imperial Cities, Ilsfeld was attacked by Heilsbronn forces; the village was laid waste, with 40 people killed and 300 head of livestock removed.

In 1456 the Württembergischer Landgraben (Württemberg Ditch) was created as a border fortification running north of Ilsfeld, with a defensive tower, the Landturm, north of the hamlet of Wüstenhausen. In 1460 the Battle of Wüstenhausen took place there, with Duke Ulrich defeating the forces of Frederick the Victorious, Elector Palatine. The many battles in the 15th century are probably why Ilsfeld was surrounded by a high wall with ten towers.

Ilsfeld suffered greatly in the wars of the 16th and 17th centuries. In 1519, Duke William IV of Bavaria quartered his army there; during the Thirty Years' War there were outbreaks of plague in 1626 and 1634 and Imperial troops were quartered there in 1638/39; and in 1645 it was plundered by French, Hessian and Weimar troops. During the war the population shrank from about 1,200 to barely 100, and years after the war ended, many fields and vineyards were still abandoned. Despite a large number of settlers from Austria and Switzerland, it took approximately a century for the settlement to recover. During that time there were further quarterings of troops and required contributions. Between 1672 and 1675, Brandenburg troops were several times quartered in Ilsfeld. In 1693, during the War of the Palatine Succession, French troops used it as a base to attack Heilbronn.

Rural district of Württemberg

In the 18th century, there was again peace and modest growth in Ilsfeld. After the Napoleonic Wars, following which the entire surrounding area became Württemberg territory, and after a territorial reorganization of the Duchy, Ilsfeld belonged to the Oberamt of Bietigheim beginning in 1808, and then to the Oberamt of Besigheim beginning in 1810. The settlement slowly grew beyond its medieval borders, first west and east along the main street. By 1832, the town gates no longer existed. In 1844, for the first time, the number of inhabitants officially exceeded 2,000. However, poverty was ever-present until well into the 19th century. There were famines in 1816, 1831 and 1841, and between 1810 and 1890, 651 residents emigrated, mostly to America but also to Africa (the Cape Colony) and Russia (the Caucasus).

Between 1889 and 1891, a road was built connecting Ilsfeld to the administrative center of Besigheim, and in November 1899 a segment of the Bottwar Valley Railway was inaugurated; the following year, this was extended from Ilsfeld to Heilbronn South. The Royal Württemberg State Railways built the station at Ilsfeld as a unified station of Type IIIa. The railroad caused Ilsfeld to develop in the early 20th century from a purely rural settlement to a bedroom community for Heilbronn, where more than 200 residents were soon working, mostly in factories such as the Ackermann plying mill, the Knorr soup factory, the Bruckmann silverware factory and the Flammer soap factory. After an electricity generating plant was built in Pleidelsheim around 1907, Ilsfeld was electrified by 1914.

1904 fire

One person was killed and 706 left homeless. The losses were assessed at 1,392,696 Reichsmarks. The fire was caused by a portable stove that children were using to bake apples and that tipped over. Firefighting efforts were considerably hindered by the different hose couplings used by Württemberg firefighting units. The fire shocked the whole of Germany; during the following days King William II visited the town, as did more than 40,000 of the curious.

By August 8, the Württemberg Ministerial Division of Road and Water Construction had organized a rebuilding committee led by Oberbaurat Richard Leibbrand, which began by erecting a temporary barracks encampment to house the homeless over the winter. The major public buildings (town hall, church, school, teacher's and minister's residences, and the Dorastift kindergarten) were designed by the architects Paul Schmohl and Georg Stähelin in a traditional Swabian style with Jugendstil elements. By 1906, rebuilding was largely complete.

Ilsfeld remained primarily rural in character until World War II; industry failed to gain a foothold, primarily  because of a lack of infrastructure. In 1935 there were 335 agricultural concerns, mainly smallholdings, employing 40–60% of the residents, and 120 small businesses with a total of 220 employees. A planned post bus connection to Lauffen am Neckar, which would have enabled residents to work at the cement works, failed to materialize in 1929.

Third Reich
Hugo Heinrich, elected Schultheiß in 1916 (his title became Bürgermeister, mayor, in 1932) became a member of the Nazi Party in 1934 and remained in office throughout the Third Reich; he petitioned to retire for reasons of ill health in 1937 but was unable to obtain the necessary medical certification. From 1939 on, he was also mayor of Schozach under a joint arrangement.

Construction began in 1935 on the Reichsautobahn segment between Heilbronn and Stuttgart, now Bundesautobahn 81, which passes through the southeastern part of Ilsfeld. When the Oberamt of Besigheim was dissolved in 1938, unlike most other localities within it, Ilsfeld became part of the district of Heilbronn.

During the war, Ilsfeld was at first largely spared by air raids, although surrounding localities were heavily affected beginning in 1941. After Heilbronn was bombed on December 4, 1944, approximately 600 people fled to Ilsfeld, which was already full of refugees and expellees. In the final days of the war, on April 14 and 16, 1945, Ilsfeld itself became a bombing target; about 50 buildings were destroyed and several people were killed. The town was occupied by American troops on April 20. Refugees caused the number of inhabitants to swell from 1,999 in 1939 to 2,164 at the end of 1945.

Post-war
After Hugo Heinrich retired in 1947, two temporary mayors were appointed, followed in 1947/48 by Gottlob Frank, who had previously acted as the mayor's deputy. In 1948 Eugen Härle was elected to the position; he served until 1974, from 1954 to 1972, when it was annexed by Ilsfeld, once again also as mayor of Schozach.

The autobahn was not returned to service until 1950. At first Ilsfeld only had one-way access for military vehicles; in 1956 an exit was built, and in 1968–74, two rest stops. The railroad was closed in 1967; together with the proximity of the autobahn exit, this meant increasing traffic problems in the villages of Ilsfeld and Auenstein. Auenstein was helped with a bypass in the 1990s.

In 1950, what is now the town of Ilsfeld had 571 farms employing 1,151 people, and 217 commercial businesses employing 448. Since the 1950s, an influx of business and industry has caused considerable development in the area, with processing soon replacing agriculture as the primary source of employment. The business district of Ilsfeld proper extends from the center of the town east to the autobahn exit, and starting with the 1952 Kernersiedlung, large new residential developments have appeared to the east, north, and south. The other centers within the town have also experienced both residential and commercial development. In 1987, there were 58 farms employing 203 people, and 332 commercial businesses employing 2,029. Numerous foreigners migrated to the area to work beginning in the early 1960s; in 1987, of approximately 6,200 residents, about 550 were non-Germans.

In February 1970, a large section of the Planmauer collapsed; renovation lasted until 1974, and plans were made at the same time for renewal of the now aged village centre, which was carried out in the 1980s. This involved demolition and replacement of numerous old residential buildings that had survived the 1904 fire and restoration of buildings erected after the fire.

Annexations
Ilsfeld annexed Schozach on July 1, 1971. On December 31, 1973, Ilsfeld and Auenstein (including Abstetterhof and Helfenberg) were combined to form the new town of Ilsfeld.

Governance

Town council
In an election on June 7, 2009, the town council was reduced from 22 to 20 seats. The mayor is also a member and presides.

Coat of arms
The blazon of the coat of arms of Ilsfeld is: On a field of silver, a black stag's antler (the Württemberg heraldic emblem) over a rooted green tree. The town flag is green and white.

The tree is the ancient symbol of Ilsfeld, appearing on boundary markers since at least 1685. The stag's antler is the heraldic symbol of Württemberg. Official seals of Ilsfeld have combined the two since 1468 (the oldest known village seal and arms in Württemberg). The antler was originally to the right of the tree; the current arrangement was adopted in 1596. The colors are attested since the late 16th century. The arms were adopted by the unified town after the annexation of Auenstein, and were officially granted by the District of Heilbronn on January 24, 1978.

Twinning
 Ottery St Mary, United Kingdom (Since 2003) 
  Auenstein, Switzerland 
  Moşna, Romania

Culture and sights

Religion
Ilsfeld and Auenstein each have a Protestant parish; Ilsfeld also has a New Apostolic parish. Catholics belong to the Catholic parish of Untergruppenbach and Methodists to the parish of Abstatt-Happenbach.

Buildings
After the 1904 fire, numerous Jugendstil buildings were erected in the village of Ilsfeld. The Protestant church of St. Bartholomew on the Spreuerberg hill, designed by Paul Schmohl, incorporates a late Gothic choir and portions of the tower and west end of the former church and has Jugendstil decorations by Josef Zeitler. The nearby town hall has a Jugendstil entrance, and the school, the parsonage, and the Dorastift kindergarten are similar in style. The town hall was enlarged in 1993.

The Dorastift is on the site of the original parsonage, which was the childhood home of Ferdinand von Steinbeis, a 19th-century Württemberg politician, and until her death in 1817 the home of his grandmother Friederike Kerner, mother of Justinus Kerner; her grave is in the Ilsfeld cemetery. As a result of endowments made in the 1880s, a kindergarten was established there, and the building was replaced after the 1904 fire with a kindergarten and public bath donated by Karl Vollmöller and named for his wife Theodora.

The buildings erected along the main street after the fire in many cases have massive ground floors influenced by Jugendstil, but mostly traditional Fachwerk (half-timbering) on their upper stories. The Gasthaus Krone retains a baroque first floor with a decorated doorway constructed in 1766.

Only fragments of the town wall and its ten towers remain; these include the south wall of the cemetery and portions of the wall around the church, and two remaining towers in Turmstraße and Bollwerkstraße at the east end of the formerly walled area. The Obere Bollwerkturm was converted to a residence in 1919 with a half-timbered addition. The so-called Steinhaus in Mühlstraße, dating to 1585, is one of the oldest buildings in Ilsfeld.

In the hamlet of Wüstenhausen are the ruins of a 15th-century chapel and the Landturm, part of the Württembergischer Landgraben defensive works.

Above the hamlet of Helfenberg, part of Auenstein, are the ruins of the mid-13th-century Helfenberg Castle.

Events
The annual Ilsfelder Holzmarkt market was described as an ancient tradition in 1521. It takes place on the last weekend in August; in the 1970s it developed into a peddlers' market with a fun fair and events marquee.

Economy
Ilsfeld is a wine-growing area, with vineyards belonging to the Schozachtal, Wunnenstein und Kirchenweinberg sections of the Württembergisch Unterland wine-producing region. Viticulturists in Ilsfeld, Auenstein, Helfenberg und Abstatt belong to the Weingärtnergenossenschaft Mittleres Schozachtal. Carina Läpple was the first Ilsfelder chosen Württemberg Wine Queen, in 2000. The town is also on the Württemberger Weinstraße.

Since the 1950s, several business parks have transformed the formerly largely agricultural area. In the 1970s and 1980s, businesses employing between one and four people made up roughly two thirds of the 235 commercial employers in Ilsfeld, and there were only three or four businesses with more than 50 employees. Processing was for a long time the most significant source of employment in the town, but in the 1980s there was a large increase in the number of people employed in sales and services, in particular.

Transportation
Ilsfeld is located on Bundesautobahn 81 (Würzburg – Stuttgart) and has its own exit. From 1899 to 1968, Ilsfeld, Auenstein and Schozach had stations on the narrow-gauge Bottwar Valley Railway (Marbach am Neckar – Heilbronn South); the tracks have been taken up and the Alb-Neckar bicycle trail (Eberbach – Ulm) now runs along most of the route.

Since March 1, 2008, with increased restrictions beginning January 1, 2012, Ilsfeld proper restricts traffic to non-polluting vehicles.

Media
Ilsfeld is covered by the SO (Süd-Ost, Southeast) edition of the Heilbronner Stimme newspaper.

Education
The Steinbeis-Schulzentrum Ilsfeld school center includes a primary school and Hauptschule secondary school, a Werkrealschule vocationally oriented secondary school, and the Steinbeis Realschule. Auenstein has its own primary school, and Ilsfeld also has a special education school.

There is a town library.

Sports
Ilsfeld has an open-air pool with an associated DLRG lifesaving club. The Grün-Weiß (green and white) tennis club has a clubhouse and several tennis courts adjacent.

The Sportclub Ilsfeld (SCI) offers badminton, soccer, judo, karate, track and field, gymnastics, and volleyball.

Notable people

Honorary citizens 
By a decision of the community council dated July 12, 1906, the following people were declared honorary citizens of Ilsfeld in recognition of their services during the rebuilding after the 1904 fire:
 Richard Leibbrand
 Councilman Zimmermann (died 1911), Besigheim
 Karl Vollmöller (1848-1922), German philologist
 Robert Vollmöller (1849 – 1911)
 Julius Spohn (1841 – 1919)
 Ernst Hartmann (minister)
The following have been awarded honorary citizenship since then:
 1951: Gottlob Obenland (1871 – 1966) 
 1971: Gottlob Frank (1900 – 1983)
 1976: Eugen Härle (1911 – 2003)
 1992: Herbert Diener (1927 – 2006)

Others

 Lothar Späth, politician (CDU), raised in Ilsfeld

References

External links
 

Heilbronn (district)
Württemberg